Anthem Inc. is the seventh album from Naughty by Nature. The album marks a 20-year anniversary for the hip-hop trio. This is the first Naughty by Nature release featuring all three members - Treach, Vin Rock and Kay Gee - since 1999's Nineteen Naughty Nine: Nature's Fury.

Track listing
Anthem Inc. Intro 
Naughty Nation 
Throw It Up (feat. Tah G Ali)
I Gotta Lotta (feat. Sonny Black)
Perfect Party (feat. Joe)
Flags (feat. Balewa Muhammad)
Name Game (Remember) (feat. Kate Nauta)
God Is Us (feat. Queen Latifah)
Gunz & Butta (feat. Du It All, Black, Dueja & B. Wells)
I Know What It's Like
Ride
Impeach The Planet (feat. Du It All, Black & Fam)
Doozit (feat. Syleena Johnson)
Uptown Anthem (20th Anniversary Version)
Hip Hop Hooray (20th Anniversary Version) 
O.P.P. (20th Anniversary Version)
Feel Me Flow (20th Anniversary Version) 
Everything's Gonna Be Alright (20th Anniversary Version)
Perfect Party (Instrumental) (iTunes Deluxe Edition Only)
Name Game (Remember) (Instrumental) (iTunes Deluxe Edition Only)  
God Is Us (Instrumental) (iTunes Deluxe Edition Only)

References

 Naughty by Nature's Anthem Inc. out 12/6, Art & Track Listing

2011 albums
Naughty by Nature albums